"Apollo Kids" is a song by rapper Ghostface Killah, released as the lead single of his second album Supreme Clientele. The song features fellow Wu-Tang Clan member Raekwon and contains a sample of "Cool Breeze" as performed by R&B singer/songwriter Solomon Burke. It was later added to his greatest hits album Shaolin's Finest.

Music video
The music video for "Apollo Kids" was directed by Chris Robinson and set in Staten Island. The video showcases Starks Enterprises, portrayed as a gigantic factory where shoes are manufactured, for which Ghostface as Tony Starks stands as CEO. Ghostface spends much of the video donning mink coats and rapping while eating a golden  ice cream cone.

Track listing
"Apollo Kids" (radio version) (3:56) 
"Apollo Kids" (instrumental) (3:56)
"Apollo Kids" (LP version) (3:54)
"Apollo Kids" (a cappella) (3:26)

Charts

References

1999 songs
Ghostface Killah songs
Songs written by Ghostface Killah
Songs written by Raekwon
Epic Records singles
1999 singles
Raekwon songs